Michael E. Hastings (born October 6, 1980) is a Democratic member of the Illinois Senate from the 19th Legislative District. The district includes all or parts of Lockport, New Lenox, Mokena, Orland Park, Tinley Park, Frankfort, Frankfort Square, Homer Glen, Joliet,  Richton Park, University Park, Matteson, Homewood, Flossmoor, Park Forest, Olympia Fields, Country Club Hills, Hazel Crest, Markham, and Oak Forest.

Prior to his election as a State Senator, Hastings was an officer in the United States Army, businessman and a vice president of a school board of Consolidated High School District 230.

Early life and education
Michael E. Hastings was born and raised in Orland Hills, Illinois as one of six children of Mary and Kyle Hastings. Hastings attended Victor J. Andrew High School where he was an Illinois All-State Football offensive lineman. He served as student government president of Victor J. Andrew High School, and then qualified for an appointment to the U.S. Military Academy at West Point.

Hastings earned his Bachelor of Science degree in leadership and management at West Point and played as an offensive lineman on Army's Division-I football team for four seasons, including the annual Army-Navy rivalry game in Washington D.C. Hastings graduated from West Point in 2003 and was commissioned as an officer in the U.S. Army. Hastings was at West Point when al-Qaida terrorists attacked the U.S. on September 11, 2001. He later served in Iraq, advanced to the rank of captain and served as aide-de-camp to the commanding general of the 1st Infantry Division. He earned a Bronze Star for meritorious service in a combat zone.

In 2008, Hastings joined Johnson & Johnson's Biosurgery sales division in Chicago serving hospitals, health care facilities and surgeons.

Hastings' public service career began with his election to the Board of Trustees for High School District 230 and then as vice president of the board. Hastings also served as co-chair of the district's finance and education committees. Hastings earned a master's degree in business administration with honors from the Gies College of Business at the University of Illinois at Urbana–Champaign and a Juris Doctor degree from John Marshall Law School in Chicago.

Illinois Senate

Pension reform
Hastings sponsored Senate Bill 2591 to help combat the state's nearly $100 billion pension shortfall. The plan, created with help from the University of Illinois Institute for Government and Public Affairs, calls for workers at state colleges and universities to kick in an additional two percent to their pension funds. The increase would be phased in over a four-year period. Also under the plan, the three percent compound interest on cost-of-living-adjustments, or COLAs, would change to one-half of the inflation rate. Although the proposal involves the State Universities Retirement System, Glenn Poshard, President of Southern Illinois University, said it could "serve as an example for a more comprehensive pension reform plan."

Hastings also sponsored HB 4691 which provides that, upon creation of a new downstate police pension fund by referendum or census, the Illinois Municipal Retirement Fund (IMRF) shall transfer to the new pension fund the employee contributions for service as a police officer of the municipality that is creating the new pension fund, plus interest, and an amount representing employer contributions, equal to the total amount determined under item (1). Provides that the transfer shall terminate any further rights of such employees under IMRF that arise out of that service. House Bill 4691 was signed into law by Governor Pat Quinn on July 16, 2014.

South Suburban Airport
Hastings co-sponsored Senate Bill 20, which was signed into law by Governor Quinn on July 25, 2014. The act, co-sponsored by Hastings, dedicated funding to the development of a new airport in Peotone. The airport will be built by the Illinois Department of Transportation and operate in a public-private partnership, known as a "P3". "I made a commitment to the residents of the 19th District that I would look for new opportunities to create jobs and foster growth in the Southland," Hastings said."

Committee assignments

Tinley Park Mental Health Center
In January 2022, after months of negotiations, the State of Illinois agreed to sell the Tinley Park Mental Health Center (TPMHC) to the village of Tinley Park. The deal required approval by the State legislature and needed to be introduced as a bill by Sen. Michael Hastings. However, in early 2022, Sen. Hastings failed to introduce the required legislation to the Illinois General Assembly, effectively killing the sale.

Legislative & Community Service awards
Senator Hastings has received the following legislative and community service awards:
Distinguished Legislative Service Award, The Link & Option Center
Excellence in Leadership Award, Chicago Southland Convention & Visitors Bureau
Excellence in Leadership Award, South Suburban Park and Recreation Professional Association
Environmental Champion, Illinois Environmental Council
Elected Official of the Year, Matteson Chamber of Commerce
Friend of Agriculture, Illinois Farm Bureau
Humanitarian Award, Grand Prairie Services
Legislator of the Year, Illinois Association of Family Physicians 
Legislator of the Year, Illinois Association of Park Districts
Legislator of the Year, Illinois Municipal League
Legislator of the Year, Illinois Public Transportation Association
Legislator of the Year, Illinois Public Higher Education Cooperative
Legislator of the Year, Illinois State Crime Commission
Legislator of the Year, Illinois State Veterinary Medical Association 
Legislator of the Year, Mental Health Association of Illinois
Legislator of the Year, Sangamon County Farm Bureau
Legislator of the Year, Southwest Community Services Foundation
Legislator of the Year, Southland Health Care Forum
Legislative Excellence Award, Associated Beer Distributors of Illinois
Martin Luther King, Jr. Spirit of Excellence Award, Southland Ministerial Health Network
Public Official of the Year, Illinois Association of Chiefs of Police
Alumni of the Year, the University of Illinois College of Business
Alumni Hall of Fame Recipient, Consolidated High School District #230

2022 Illinois secretary of state campaign
Hastings entered the race for Illinois secretary of state in the 2022 election on March 3, 2021, but withdrew in June 2021.

Electoral history

Military awards and decorations
{| style="width:100%;"
|-
|valign="top" |

References

External links
Biography, bills and committees at the 98th Illinois General Assembly
By session: 98th

1980 births
Living people
Democratic Party Illinois state senators
Illinois lawyers
People from Tinley Park, Illinois
United States Military Academy alumni
Gies College of Business alumni
John Marshall Law School (Chicago) alumni
21st-century American politicians
Military personnel from Illinois
School board members in Illinois
United States Army officers